The sport of football in the country of East Timor is run by the Federação de Futebol de Timor-Leste. The association administers the national football team as well as the former national league system the Super Liga. The current top league competition is the Liga Futebol Amadora, containing 21 teams in total. This consists of a two division system, with the Primeira Divisaun as the top division in the nation followed by the Segunda Divisaun. The current annual national cup competition is the Taça 12 de Novembro. Association football (soccer) is the most popular sport in the country.

National football stadium

References